Rogelio A. González (January 27, 1920 – May 22, 1984) was a Mexican film director, screenwriter, and actor. González directed 70 films, was nominated for a Silver Ariel four times, and was also nominated for a Golden Ariel for La culta dama (1957). His film Hambre nuestra de cada día was entered into the 1st Moscow International Film Festival.

Selected filmography
 Over the Waves (1950)

As director

References

External links

1984 deaths
1920 births
Mexican film directors
Comedy film directors
Parody film directors
Mexican parodists
Mexican male film actors
20th-century Mexican male actors